The numbered roads in Essex County account for  of roads in the Canadian province of Ontario.
These roads include King's Highways that are signed and maintained by the province, as well as county roads under the jurisdiction of the Essex County xxx. The third type of existing roadway in the county is locally maintained municipal roads, many of which are concession roads and sidelines; these are beyond the scope of this article.

Odd-numbered roads are generally north–south, with numbers increasing from west to east; even-numbered roads are generally east–west roads, with numbers increasing from north to south, with some exceptions. County roads are not signed within the city limits of Windsor. There are also several unrelated roads named "Malden Road". In 2002, the City of Windsor and the Town of Tecumseh swapped land with each other. Windsor gained land west of Banwell Road, including Windsor International Airport and Tecumseh Mall. Portions of several county roads within the land given to Windsor lost their designation as a result of this exchange.

The 43 numbered routes provide year-round access to the rural areas of the county, with roads within Windsor under a separate authority. The longest road in Essex County is County Road 20, which stretches  between Windsor and Leamington via the shoreline of the Detroit River and Lake Erie.

King's Highways 
As in the rest of Ontario, the provincially maintained highways in Essex County are designated with a shield-shaped sign topped with a crown. The highway number is in the centre, with the word ONTARIO below. These signs are known as shields, but may be referred to as reassurance markers.
Provincially maintained highways generally have greater construction standards than municipally or locally maintained roads.

County roads 
There are 40 numbered county roads in Essex County. County roads are signed with a flowerpot-shaped sign, as are most regional and county roads in Ontario. The road number appears in the centre of the sign, with the word ESSEX above and the word COUNTY below. Like King's Highways, these signs are known as shields.

Roads

King's Highways

County roads 
County roads are referred to on signage as Essex County Road X. The following table lists existing numbered roads maintained by the County of Essex.

Former county roads

Windsor Suburban Roads 

Windsor Suburban Roads were a special designation given to certain county roads in Essex County that were close to the City of Windsor. The following roads had part or all of their routes listed as "Windsor Suburban Roads":

 County Road 2
 County Road 3
 County Road 6
 County Road 7
 County Road 8
 County Road 9
 County Road 11
 County Road 17
 County Road 19
 County Road 21
 County Road 25
 County Road 34
 County Road 40
 County Road 42
 County Road 46
 County Road 117

The roads were managed by the "Windsor Suburban Roads Commission" until 1998, when Windsor became a single-tier municipality. The Suburban Roads reverted to Essex County.

See also 
 List of roads in Windsor, Ontario

Notes

References

Route maps

External links 
 Official road maps of Essex County.

 
Essex County